Varkhomeyevo is a rural locality (a village) in Vakhromeyevskoye Rural Settlement, Kameshkovsky District, Vladimir Oblast, Russia. The population was 198 as of 2010.

Geography 
Varkhomeyevo is located on the Talsha River, 18 km north of Kameshkovo (the district's administrative centre) by road. Posyolok imeni Gorkogo is the nearest rural locality.

References 

Rural localities in Kameshkovsky District